The Atari Transputer Workstation (also known as ATW-800, or simply ATW) is a workstation class computer released by Atari Corporation in the late 1980s, based on the INMOS transputer. It was introduced in 1987 as the Abaq, but the name was changed before sales began. Sales were almost non-existent, and the product was canceled after only a few hundred units had been produced.

History 
In 1986, Tim King left his job at MetaComCo, along with a few other employees, to start Perihelion Software in England. There they started development of a new parallel-processing operating system known as "HeliOS". At about the same time a colleague, Jack Lang, started Perihelion (later Perihelion Hardware) to create a new transputer based workstation that would run HeliOS.

While at MetaComCo, much of the Perihelion Software team had worked with both Atari Corp. and Commodore International, producing ST BASIC for the former, and AmigaDOS for the latter. The principals still had contacts with both companies. Commodore had expressed some interest in their new system, and showed demos of it on an add-on card running inside an Amiga 2000. It appears they later lost interest in it. Atari Corp. met with Perihelion and work began on what would eventually become the Atari Transputer Workstation.

The machine was first introduced at the November 1987 COMDEX with the name Abaq. Two versions were shown at the time; one was a card that connected to the Mega ST bus expansion slot, the second version was a stand-alone tower system containing a miniaturized Mega ST inside. The external card version was dropped at some point during development. It was later learned that the "Abaq" name was in use in Europe, so the product name was changed to ATW800. Perihelion remained the exclusive distributor in England. A first run of prototypes was released in May 1988, followed by a production run in May 1989. In total, only 350 machines were produced (depending on the source either 50 or 100 of the total were prototypes).

The team in charge of the ATW's video system, "Blossom", would later work on another Atari project, the Atari Jaguar video game console.

Overview 

The Atari Transputer Workstation system consists of three main parts:

 the main motherboard containing a T800-20 transputer and 4 MB of RAM (expandable to 16 MB)
 a complete miniaturized Mega ST acting as an I/O processor with 512 kB of RAM
 the Blossom video system with 1 MB of dual-ported RAM

All of these are connected using the Transputer's 20 Mbit/s processor links. The motherboard contains four slots for additional "farm cards" containing four transputers each, meaning that a fully expanded ATW contains 17 transputers. Each runs at 20 MHz (the -20 in the name) which supplied about 10 MIPS each. The bus is available externally, allowing several ATWs to be connected into one large farm. The motherboard includes a separate slot for one of the INMOS crossbar switches to improve inter-chip networking performance.

HeliOS is Unix-like, but not Unix. It lacks memory protection, due largely to the lack of an MMU on the transputer. This is not a major issue, as the Transputer's stack-based architecture makes an MMU less important. Meanwhile, HeliOS is Unix-like enough that it ran standard Unix utilities, including the X Window System as the machine's graphical user interface (GUI). In addition HeliOS runs on all of the transputers in a farm concurrently, which allows all computing tasks to be fully distributed. Powering off an ATW does not affect the overall farm, and the tasks simply move to other processors on other systems.

Blossom supports several video modes:

mode 0: 1280 by 960 pixels, 16 colors out of a palette of 4096 (including 16 true grayscales, on a monochrome monitor)
mode 1: 1024 by 768 pixels, 256 colors out of a palette of 16.7 million
mode 2: 640 by 480 pixels (2 virtual screens), 256 colors out of a palette of 16.7 million
mode 3: 512 by 480 pixels, 16.7 million colors

Blossom also includes a number of high-speed effects (128 megapixel fill rates) and blitter functionality, including the ability to apply up to four masks on a bit-blit operation in a fashion similar to a modern graphics processing unit's ability to apply several textures to a 3D object.

One oddity of the ATW is that it appears that the Blossom is responsible for the DRAM refresh, although the ATW includes such hardware internally.

Image gallery

References

External links 
 Ram's Totally Unofficial ATW800 Pages
 Atari Transputer at Atarimuseum.com
 Atari transputer Workstation 800 Data Sheet
 Transputer emulator - It emulates a single T414 transputer (with no FPU, no blitting instructions) and supplies the file and terminal I/O services that were usually supplied by the host computer system.
 Atari ATW800 information - including Helios software, documentation and everything else for setting up ATW800
 Daves Old Computers - Atari Transputer Workstation - manuals
 Articles written by Mike Charnley-Fisher at the time

Computer workstations
Transputer